is the collective name for Hayao Miyazaki's annotated manga and illustrated essays he contributed, very sporadically, to the hobby magazine Model Graphix in the 1980s and early ’90s. The name has also been translated into English as Hayao Miyazaki's Random Thoughts Notebook. Game designer Kazuma Kujo stated in a 2012 Retro Gamer article that the book served as inspiration during development of Metal Slug.

Development
The Daydream Notes began as private sketches that can be traced back to Miyazaki's earliest childhood. Born in 1941 he, like war babies all over Europe, drew almost exclusively planes, tanks and battleships.

Media

Magazine
Installments of Daydream Notes were irregularly printed. Episodes occasionally appeared in the November 1984 through May 1990 issues of the monthly magazine Model Graphix.

Books
Selections from his Daydream Notes have been bundled in book form, published by Dainippon Kaiga in December 1992. In August 1997 a revised and expanded edition was released by the same publisher. The first edition does not contain Hikōtei Jidai.

The annotated manga  is not included in either edition but appears in a different collection, published, by Dainippon Kaiga, in August 2002.

Installments / Contents
 Shirarezaru Kyojin no Mattei
 Kōtetsu no Ikuji
 Tahōtō no Deban
 Noufu no Me
 Ryū no Kōtetsu
 Kyūshū Jōkū no Jūgōsakuki
 Kōshahōtō
 Q-ship
 Anshōmaru Monogatari
 London Jōkuu 1918-nen
 Saihin Zensen
 Hikōtei Jidai, an early version of Porco Rosso
 Buta no Tora

Radio broadcast
In 1995, Miyazaki's Daydream Notes was turned into a series of radio broadcasts for Nippon Broadcasting System. When commenting on this dramatisation in an interview for Tokuma Shoten's Animage magazine, Miyazaki explains his political stance as an opponent of Japan's rearmament and contrasts this with his lifelong interests in war, military affairs and military hardware. He explains that he expresses this fascination by drawing the fantastical craft, which are then published in Model Graphix, a magazine for scale model creation. He said that he did his best drawings when he was serializing his manga Nausicaä, "After staying up till dawn drawing the last manga pages to meet the printer's deadline, I would draw these models the next day; each would take a week. […] In essence it is my hobby to draw seemingly real vehicles, it works as my psychological release valve."

Notes

References

Bibliography
 .
 .

External links

Comics by Hayao Miyazaki